Lucheng District (Wenzhounese: luo zen) is a district of the city of Wenzhou, Zhejiang province, China. It is the central district and government seat of Wenzhou.

The literal meaning of the name Lucheng is the city of deer. It originated from a myth that a white deer was spotted in this area long time ago.

The other 2 districts of the Wenzhou urban area are Longwan and Ouhai.

Lucheng was built in the first year of Taining in the Eastern Jin Dynasty (323 AD). Since ancient times, merchants have gathered in Lucheng, known as the "Famous Town of East Ou". 

In 2020, Lucheng District will achieve a regional GDP of 117.232 billion yuan, a year-on-year increase of 3.1% based on comparable prices.

Administrative divisions
Subdistricts:
Wuma Subdistrict (五马街道), Lianchi Subdistrict (莲池街道), Shuixin Subdistrict (水心街道), Nanmen Subdistrict (南门街道), Jiangbin Subdistrict (江滨街道), Puxieshi Subdistrict (蒲鞋市街道), Guanghua Subdistrict (广化街道), Hongdian Subdistrict (洪殿街道), Nanpu Subdistrict (南浦街道), Liming Subdistrict (黎明街道), Xiushan Subdistrict (绣山街道), Huanglong Subdistrict (黄龙街道), Shuangyu Subdistrict (双屿街道), Qidu Subdistrict (七都街道), Yangyi Subdistrict (仰义街道), Nanjiao Subdistrict (南郊街道)

The only town is Tengqiao (藤桥镇)

References

External links

Districts of Zhejiang
Geography of Wenzhou